Thérèse Raquin (also The Adultress) is a 1953 French-Italian drama film directed by Marcel Carné and starring Simone Signoret, Raf Vallone and Jacques Duby. The story is loosely based on the 1867 novel of the same title by Émile Zola but with the setting updated to 1953. It was shot at the Neuilly Studios in Paris and on location in Lyon. The film's sets were designed by the art director Paul Bertrand. It was screened at the 14th Venice International Film Festival where it won the Silver Lion.

Plot
Thérèse, an orphan, has been brought up by her widowed aunt in a dingy backstreet shop in Lyon and married to her sickly first cousin Camille. Into their stifling existence comes Laurent, a lively Italian truck driver. He is immediately struck by Thérèse, who succumbs to him but will not abandon her husband and aunt. Once aware of the relationship, Camille and his mother plot to get rid of Thérèse.

Camille will take her to Paris and hand her over to another aunt, but Laurent climbs onto the train and, his temper overcoming him, pushes Camille out in the dark at full speed. He slips out at the next stop and Thérèse maintains to the police that she was asleep in her compartment the whole time. The news of Camille's death gives his mother a stroke that leaves her speechless, cared for by Thérèse who warns Laurent to stay away and not attract police attention.

However there was another man asleep in Thérèse's compartment on the train and, when he sees the newspaper reports, comes down to Lyon and asks for half a million francs to stay silent. Knowing that Thérèse and Laurent might kill him rather than pay, he leaves a letter with the maid in his hotel, asking her to post it to the police if he does not return. They manage to find 400,000 francs, which he accepts and gives them a signed receipt but, on leaving, he is knocked over by a lorry and dies. The film ends as the maid takes his letter to the post.

Cast
Simone Signoret as Thérèse Raquin
Raf Vallone as Laurent LeClaire
Jacques Duby as Camille Raquin
Sylvie as Madame Raquin
Maria Pia Casilio as Georgette, la bonne
Marcel André as Michaud
Martial Rèbe as Grivet 
 Paul Frankeur as Le contrôleur
 Alain Terrane as Un camionneur
 Bernard Véron as 	Le postier
 Francette Vernillat as Françoise, la bossue 
 Lucien Hubert as Le chef de gare de Dijon
 Madeleine Barbulée as Madame Noblet, une cliente 
 Nerio Bernardi as 	Le médecin
 Roland Lesaffre as 	Riton, le matelot maître-chanteur

Reception 
The Japanese filmmaker Akira Kurosawa cited Thérèse Raquin as one of his 100 favorite films.

References

Bibliography
 Goble, Alan. The Complete Index to Literary Sources in Film. Walter de Gruyter, 1999.
 Hayward, Susan. Simone Signoret: The Star as Cultural Sign. Continuum, 2004.

External links
 

1953 films
Films directed by Marcel Carné
French thriller drama films
1950s French-language films
Italian thriller drama films
1950s thriller drama films
Films based on works by Émile Zola
Adultery in films
French black-and-white films
Italian black-and-white films
Lux Film films
Films shot in Lyon
Films set in Lyon
1950s French films
1950s Italian films